Zach Murray (born 29 March 1997) is an Australian professional golfer who currently plays on the European Tour, Asian Tour and the PGA Tour of Australasia.

Early life and amateur career
Murray was born and grew up in Wodonga, Victoria, Australia. He was brought up in a non-golfing family, but learned to take up the game at the age of 13. He had notable success as an amateur, including becoming the second-youngest men's winner of the Victorian Amateur Championship in 2013. He also added another victory in China, at the Aaron Baddeley International Junior against a strong international field. This win gave him a start at the 2014 Emirates Australian Open.

Murray won the 2015 Australian Master of the Amateurs by two strokes in a field which included future stars Bryson DeChambeau and Cameron Davis.

Murray won his first professional event at the 2018 Nexus Risk TSA Group WA Open while still having his amateur status. A final round of 69 saw him win by two strokes. He went on to turn professional a few weeks after this win.

Professional career
Murray turned professional in November 2018. He won the 2019 New Zealand Open, becoming the third fastest rookie to win on the Asian Tour after Kane Webber (2006 Macao Open) and Todd Sinnott (2017 Leopalace21 Myanmar Open), who both won on their second starts on the Asian Tour. As the New Zealand Open was co-sanctioned by the Asian Tour and the PGA Tour of Australasia, it gave Murray full playing rights on both tours, until the end of the 2021 season.

Amateur wins
2013 Victorian Amateur Championship, Aaron Baddeley International Junior
2015 Australian Master of the Amateurs

Professional wins (2)

Asian Tour wins (1)

1Co-sanctioned by the PGA Tour of Australasia

PGA Tour of Australasia wins (2)

1Co-sanctioned by the Asian Tour

Results in World Golf Championships

1Cancelled due to COVID-19 pandemic

NT = No tournament
"T" = Tied

Team appearances
Amateur
Bonallack Trophy (representing Asia/Pacific): 2016
Sloan Morpeth Trophy (representing Australia): 2016 (winners)
Australian Men's Interstate Teams Matches (representing Victoria): 2014 (winners), 2016, 2017 (winners), 2018 (winners)

References

External links

Australian male golfers
European Tour golfers
Asian Tour golfers
PGA Tour of Australasia golfers
People from Wodonga
Sportsmen from Victoria (Australia)
1997 births
Living people